This article lists the complete poetic bibliography of William Wordsworth, including his juvenilia, describing his poetic output during the years 1785-1797, and any previously private and, during his lifetime, unpublished poems.

Key

Notes 

 1.In 1798, approximately a third of the poem was published under the title: "The Female Vagrant". "The Female Vagrant" began at either Stanzas: XXIII or XXXIV of the poem in its current form.

References 

Works by William Wordsworth
Lists of poems